Jesse P. Abramson (March 3, 1904 – June 11, 1979) was an American sports writer.

Biography
Abramson was the founder of the New York Track Writers Association. Jesse Abramson Award is named after him.

Between 1924 and 1964, he wrote for the New York Herald Tribune. In 1976, he was a press liaison for the Olympic Committee of the United States.

Works
 Famous Sports Moments, Associated Features (New York, NY), 1958.
 Contributor to Best Sports Stories, Dutton

Recognition
 International Jewish Sports Hall of Fame
 Grantland Rice Award of the Sportsmen Brotherhood
 James J. Walker Award
 New York Track Writers Association Award
 Nat Fleischer Memorial Award for Excellence in Boxing Journalism
 National Track and Field Hall of Fame

References

Further reading
 Dictionary of Literary Biography, Volume 241: American Sportswriters and Writers on Sport, Gale (Detroit, MI), 2001.

1904 births
1979 deaths
American sports journalists
International Jewish Sports Hall of Fame inductees